Max Alexander (born May 11, 1981, in Camden, New Jersey) is an American boxer.

Professional career
Alexander began his professional career in 2004 as a cruiser weight.  Whilst he was undefeated, he would have lost a bout to Marty Lindquist in 2006 via a 1st round KO, however the bout was later declared a no contest because Lindquist failed a drug test. Although they would re-match and Alexander won by decision. His current professional record is 15 wins, 6 losses and 1 no contest.

The Contender
Max Alexander was one of the featured boxers on the 3rd season of the boxing reality TV series The Contender, which premiered September 4, 2007, on ESPN. He was defeated by Sam Soliman in that season's second episode.

Roy Jones Jr.
On December 10, 2011, after a 2-year pause from boxing, Alexander fought the biggest fight of his career when he faced the boxing legend: Roy Jones Jr. for a vacant cruiserweight championship in what many assumed would be the boxing legends' last fight. Alexander lost by unanimous decision.

Professional boxing record

References

External links
 

1981 births
Living people
Boxers from New Jersey
Sportspeople from Camden, New Jersey
The Contender (TV series) participants
American male boxers